The State Duma of the Federal Assembly of the Russian Federation of the 7th convocation is a former convocation of the lower house of Russian parliament.

The composition of the 7th State Duma was based on the results of the 2016 parliamentary election. Elections were held using a mixed system: 225 deputies were elected on party lists and 225 — in single-member constituencies. Of the 14 parties participating in the elections, only four were able to overcome the required 5% electoral threshold. Two more parties and one independent candidate were able to enter the State Duma via single-mandate constituencies.

Leadership

The first meeting, according to tradition, was held by its eldest deputy, 86-year-old Zhores Alferov (CPRF). Alferov was joined on the podium by other elder deputies Valentina Tereshkova (UR), Vladimir Zhirinovsky (LDPR), Galina Khovanskaya (SR).

On 5 October 2016, Vyacheslav Volodin was elected Chairman of the State Duma.

Election of Chairman
On 23 September 2016, President Vladimir Putin proposed that United Russia nominate Vyacheslav Volodin to the post of Chairman of the State Duma. The majority leader Vladimir Vasilyev said that the United Russia faction will support the candidacy of Volodin. On 24 September, United Russia approved candidates for the posts of chairman and Vice Chairmen of the State Duma. The heads of the Liberal Democratic Party and A Just Russia factions also announced their support for Volodin.

The Communist Party nominated Dmitry Novikov for the position of Chairman of the State Duma.

Factions

After the election, four parliamentary factions formed. The largest fraction consists of 335 Deputies, consisting of 334 deputies from United Russia and one Independent Deputy. United Russia increased the number of their faction by more than 100 seats, thus obtaining a constitutional majority (2/3 of seats). In first time since 2007, two small parties were also able to pass in addition to the four major parties in the State Duma. Both parties have one Deputy, and they are not included in one of the factions. The Rodina party received representation in the State Duma, the first since 2003. Also in the State Duma was the party of Civic Platform, which participated in the elections for the first time.

Committees and Commissions

Committees
On September 26, 2016, fractions distributed positions of heads of committees.

Commissions

Major legislation

First session
 October 7, 2016: Ratification of the agreement with Syria regarding the location of the grouping of the Russian Aerospace Forces, with 446 votes in favor.
 October 19, 2016: Ratification of a bill on the suspension agreement with the United States on plutonium disposition, with 445 votes in favor.
 November 18, 2016: Federal Budget for 2017 is passed with 334 votes in favor.

Second session
 January 20, 2017: Ratification of the agreement with Turkey on Turkish Stream, with 416 votes in favor.
 January 27, 2017: Adoption of the law on decriminalization of family beatings, with 380 votes in favor.
 June 9, 2017: Elvira Nabiullina re-approved as Governor of the Central Bank of Russia, with 360 votes in favor.
July 19, 2017: Adoption of the law on revoking Russian citizenship (not granted through birth) for terrorism, with 409 votes in favor.

Third session
 November 15, 2017: Adoption of amendments to the law "About Information", regarding the status of foreign media as foreign agents, with 414 votes in favor.
 November 24, 2017: Federal Budget for 2018 is passed with 341 votes in favor.

Fourth session

 May 8, 2018: Dmitry Medvedev re-approved as Prime Minister of Russia with 374 votes in favor.
 May 22, 2018: Adoption of the law on counter-sanctions with 416 votes in favor.
 May 22, 2018: Alexei Kudrin approved as Chairman of the Accounts Chamber with 264 votes in favor.
 July 24, 2018: Adoption of the law on increasing Value-added tax from 18% to 20% with 302 votes in favor.
 July 25, 2018: Adoption of amendments to the law "About Education in the Russian Federation", regulating the study of the native languages of the peoples of Russia and the official languages of the federal subjects, with 388 votes in favor.

Fifth session 
 September 27, 2018: Adoption of the law on increase the retirement age (from 55/60 to 60/65) with 332 votes in favor.
 November 21, 2018: Federal Budget for 2019 is passed with 361 votes in favor.

Sixth session 
 March 7, 2019: Adoption of the law on fight against fake news with 322 votes in favor.
 March 7, 2019: Adoption of the law on punishment for distribution in information networks of the information expressing in an indecent form obvious disrespect to society, the state, official state symbols of Russia, the Constitution of Russia and public authorities of Russia with 327 votes in favor.
 April 16, 2019: Adoption of the law on "A Sovereign Internet" with 307 votes in favor.
 June 18, 2019: Adoption of the law on the suspension of the Intermediate-Range Nuclear Forces Treaty with 417 votes in favor.

Seventh session
 November 21, 2019: Federal Budget for 2020 is passed with 337 votes in favor.

Eighth session

January 16, 2020: Mikhail Mishustin approved as Prime Minister of Russia with 383 votes in favor.
March 11, 2020: Approved amendments to the Constitution of Russia with 383 votes in favor.
July 21, 2020: Adoption of the law on three-day voting in elections with 344 votes in favor.

Ninth session
October 27, 2020: Approved amendments to the Federal Constitutional Law "On the Constitutional Court of Russia" with 357 votes in favor.
October 27, 2020: Adoption of the Federal Constitutional Law "On the Government of Russia" with 352 votes in favor.
November 10, 2020: Vitaly Savelyev approved as Minister of Transport with 274 votes in favor.
November 10, 2020: Alexander Kozlov approved as Minister of Natural Resources and Ecology with 274 votes in favor. 
November 10, 2020: Aleksey Chekunkov approved as Minister for Development of the Russian Far East and Arctic with 324 votes in favor.
November 10, 2020: Irek Faizullin approved as Minister for Construction and Housing with 328 votes in favor.
November 10, 2020: Nikolay Shulginov approved as Minister of Energy with 329 votes in favor.
November 10, 2020: Alexander Novak approved as Deputy Prime Minister with 327 votes in favor.
November 25, 2020: Adoption of the Federal Law "On the State Council of Russia" with 344 votes in favor.
November 26, 2020: Federal Budget for 2021 is passed with 328 votes in favor.

Members

Vacant seats

By-elections were held for seats that became vacant from September 2016 to June 2020. Seats that became vacant after 19 June 2020, for which no by-elections will be held, since by law by-elections are not held if MPs are elected for a term of less than a year before the next election.

Notes

References

External link

7th State Duma of the Russian Federation
Convocations of the Russian State Duma